Guangdong Hengjian Investment Holding Co., Ltd. known as Hengjian Holding is one of the holding companies of Guangdong Provincial People's Government.

The company acts as one of the investment vehicles of the provincial government in railways of Guangzhou–Dongguan–Shenzhen Intercity Railway, Dongguan–Huizhou Intercity Railway and Guangzhou–Foshan–Zhaoqing Intercity Railway, by invested  in Guangdong Pearl River Delta Intercity Railway as minority shareholder. Hengjian Holding issued 8-year medium term note of the same amount in 2009. The other shareholders of Guangdong Pearl River Delta Intercity Railway were sister company Guangdong Provincial Railway Construction Investment Group and central-government owned Guangzhou Railway Group.

Subsidiaries
 Guangdong Yudean Group (76.00%)

Equity investments
 China Aviation Industry General Aircraft (10.00%)
 China General Nuclear Power Group (10.00%)
 CGN Power (10.00%)
 China Southern Power Grid (38.40%)
 Guangdong Pearl River Delta Intercity Railway (17.80%)
 Shaoguan Iron and Steel (49.00%)
 Zhanjiang Iron and Steel (28.20%)

See also
 Guangdong Holdings
 Guangdong Provincial Railway Construction Investment Group 
 Guangdong Rising Asset Management

References

External links
  

Holding companies of China
Conglomerate companies of China
Government-owned companies of China
Companies based in Guangzhou
Chinese companies established in 2007